Ocularia apicalis is a species of beetle in the family Cerambycidae. It was described by Karl Jordan in 1894.

References

Oculariini
Beetles described in 1894
Taxa named by Karl Jordan